Homfray Channel is a deep water channel, reaching depths of 731 meters (2400 feet), located between East Redonda and the mainland coast of British Columbia, Canada.

Geography
Homfray Channel connects Desolation Sound to the southwest with Toba Inlet to the north. The channel features several small bays along its eastern shores, the largest being Forbes Bay, which has a Klahoose name of AHPOKUM.

The channel contains several islands, the largest of these islands being Melville Island and Eveleigh Island.

History
Homfray Channel's Coast Salish name is Thee chum mi yich, meaning further back inside. The channel is within the territory of the Klahoose First Nation. The channel was named after Robert Homfray, Civil Engineer , b.1824 d, 1902.  Homfray attempted to find a better way to the Chilcotin Gold fields via Bute Inlet with the aid of the Klahoose Chief.

Hydrology
Homfray Channel delineates part of the northern limit of the Salish Sea.

See also
Lewis Channel
Waddington Channel
Desolation Sound
Toba Inlet

References

Central Coast of British Columbia
Landforms of the Discovery Islands
Channels of British Columbia
Salish Sea